Wasted Youth is the fourth studio album by American metalcore band For the Fallen Dreams. It was released on July 17, 2012, and was produced by the band themselves and Tom Denney. It is their only album to be released through Artery Recordings since their departure from Rise Records (with whom they would later re-sign), as well as the first album by the band to feature bassist Brandon Stastny and the only record to feature Dylan Shippey on drums. It is also the last record by the band to feature guitarist Kalan Blehm and vocalist Dylan Richter, who featured on the two last records.

This album shows a bit of departure from their previous style with the introduction of pop punk-ish choruses and technical drumming.

Track listing

Personnel
For the Fallen Dreams
Dylan Richter – lead vocals
Jim Hocking – lead guitar, backing vocals
Kalan Blehm – rhythm guitar, backing vocals
Brandon Stastny – bass, backing vocals
Dylan Shippey – drums, percussion

Additional personnel
Tom Denney – production, engineering, mixing
For the Fallen Dreams – production, engineering
Alan Douches – mastering
Ryan Nelson (The Artery Foundation) – management
Matt Andersen (The Pantheon Agency, US) and Nanouk de Meijere (Avocado Booking, EU) – booking
Dylan Richter – photography, layout

References

2012 albums
For the Fallen Dreams albums
Artery Recordings albums
Albums produced by Tom Denney